Ouled Khodeïr is a district in Béchar Province, Algeria. It was named after its capital, Ouled Khodeïr. According to the 2008 census, the total population of the district was 7,438 inhabitants. The Oued Saoura runs from northwest to southeast through the district, and empties into Sebkhel el Melah, also in the district, after a brief excursion into Adrar Province. The N6 national highway also runs through the district on the way from Béchar to Adrar, Algeria.

Municipalities
The district is further divided into 2 municipalities:
Ouled Khodeïr
Ksabi

References

Districts of Béchar Province